The O-Jolle – (Olympiajolle) – was created as the Monotype class for the 1936 Olympic Games by designer Hellmut Wilhelm E. Stauch (GER, later RSA). The boat is a Bermuda rig and the hull was originally carvel - later GRP and cold moulded plywood construction were allowed. The O-Jolle has very good sailing capabilities and can cater for a wide spectrum of sailors from young to old and from light to heavyweight.

In 1936 Daan Kagchelland took the Gold medal in the Olympic regatta in Kiel.

The O-Jolle is still one of the largest dinghy classes in Germany and the Netherlands - the International Olympiajollen Union has over 500 members. The O-Jolle is still raced in Germany, the Netherlands, Austria, Italy and Switzerland. There are also minor fleets in Poland, Brazil, Serbia and other countries.

Since 2008 the O-Jolle has been one of the Vintage Yachting Classes during the Vintage Yachting Games.

Wall of Fame

Olympic Games

Vintage Yachting Games

European Championships

National Champions

References 

http://www.o-jolle.de
http://www.olympiajol.nl
http://www.olympiajolle-suisse.ch
http://o-jolle.at

 
Dinghies
Olympic sailing classes
1930s sailboat type designs
Former classes of World Sailing